Joseline Montoya Rodríguez (born 3 July 2000) is a Mexican footballer who plays for Guadalajara in Liga MX Femenil.

Club career

In May 2018, Montoya signed with C.D. Guadalajara. In the run-up to the 2018 Apertura, she tore a cruciate ligament in her left knee that sidelined her for nine months. Montoya belatedly made her Liga MX Femenil debut in July 2019.

International career

On 13 June 2021, Montoya made her international debut for Mexico in a 5–1 friendly loss to Japan as an 84th-minute substitute.

References

External links 
 

2000 births
Living people
Mexican women's footballers
Footballers from Jalisco
Women's association football midfielders
C.D. Guadalajara (women) footballers
Liga MX Femenil players
Mexico women's international footballers
21st-century Mexican women
Mexican footballers